Wally Dallenbach may refer to:

 Wally Dallenbach Sr., long-time participant in CART as a driver and then as an administrator
 Wally Dallenbach Jr., his son, a driver in NASCAR and later a commentator for NBC and TNT